Manstein is a German surname that may refer to

 Albrecht Gustav von Manstein (1805–1877), Prussian general 
 Erich von Manstein (1887–1973), German commander of the Wehrmacht, grandson of Albrecht, and field marshal from 1942
 Ernst von Manstein (1869–1944), Prussian army officer and prominent convert to Judaism
 Ernst Sebastian von Manstein

German-language surnames